Mount Granya State Park is a  state park near Wodonga on the northern border of Victoria, Australia.
It is named after Mount Granya, an 870 m peak. The terrain is generally steep and rocky with eucalyptus forest and low shrub.

References

State parks of Victoria (Australia)
Parks of Hume (region)